Arthur Middleton (October 29, 1681 – September 17, 1737) was a South Carolina planter and Acting Governor of the Province of South Carolina from May 7, 1725, to December 1730.

Biography
In 1678, Middleton's father (Edward) and his uncle, Arthur, moved from Barbados to South Carolina, and settled on 1,780 acres of land 14 miles north of Charles Town. His father, Edward had purchased  his uncle's share of the landgrant, plus another 3,130 acres, then settled with his wife, Sara, on the plantation; and named the plantation The Oaks.

Middleton was born on October 29, 1681. He married Mary Williams and Sarah Middleton.

Career
Middleton's father died in 1685, leaving to his wife, Sara, and their young son, Arthur, the plantation. In the following decade,  English colonists learned how to cultivate rice in fresh water swamps, exploiting the knowledge and labor of enslaved Africans. The Oaks plantation had begun to make money. By 1720, the estate consisted of over 5,000 acres and Middleton owned over 100 slaves.

A well-established member of the Carolina gentry, Middleton became an influential figure. In 1710, he traveled to London to discuss the political problems in the Carolinas.

Death
Middleton died on September 17, 1737, at the age of 56, and at that time he owned 107 slaves. Though he had eight children, only three survived. His widow, Sarah Middleton died on September 24, 1765.

References

1681 births
1737 deaths
American slave owners
Colonial governors of South Carolina
People from South Carolina
American people of Barbadian descent
American people of English descent
Middleton family